Río Miera–Cantabria Deporte is a Spanish women's road bicycle racing team, which participates in elite women's races. The team was established in 2017.

Team roster

References

External links

UCI Women's Teams
Cycling teams based in Spain
Cycling teams established in 2017